Metro is a free newspaper in Belgium, distributed on working days and aiming in particular at 18- to 44-year-old urban, active, mobile students and commuters. Separate Dutch and French-language versions, each with its own content, are according to the area's language(s) available in railway stations, subway stations, universities, etc. from dedicated stands that have the colour of the paper's header: blue for Dutch and green for French for easy recognition, especially where both occur.

The publisher is N.V. Mass Transit Media, located in the centre of the City of Brussels. The legal publisher is the company's General Manager Monique Raafels with an address in Antwerp. Its chief editor (Content Director) is Stefan Van Reeth. 

In the period of 2001-2002 the paper had a circulation of 200,000 copies. On an ordinary Thursday, 10 May 2007, its 1,455th issue in Dutch version as always mentioned the number of prints, which was 265,000. Having over 800,000 readers, it claims to be the second largest newspaper of the country. 

It has an online presence, https://www.metrotime.be where along breaking news and entertainment, a complete online version of the newspaper is available in PDF format as well as a slightly simpler layout in ordinary HTML.

Metro's revenue comes from advertising. Its news sources are mainly the longstanding Belgian press agency Belga, Associated Press (AP), and Agence France-Presse (AFP); the legal rights to its pictures are with Belga and AP (unless otherwise specified).

References

External links 
 Home page of Metrotime in Dutch
 Home page of Metrotime in French

Dutch-language newspapers published in Belgium
Free newspapers
French-language newspapers published in Belgium
Mass media in Antwerp